Jeroen van den Brink (born November 18, 1968) is a theoretical condensed matter physicist, director at the Leibniz Institute for Solid State and Materials Research, IFW Dresden and professor at the Dresden University of Technology in Germany. Van den Brink is known for contributions to the field of strongly correlated materials, in particular for proposals on magnetic and orbital ordering,  mechanisms for multiferroicity and the theory of Resonant Inelastic X-Ray Scattering (RIXS).

He obtained a PhD from the University of Groningen in 1997, was a professor of theoretical condensed matter physics working at Leiden University from 2002–2009 and in 2009 visiting professor at the
Stanford Institute for Materials and Energy Science.

References

External links
  IFW Dresden
 Lorentz Institute, Leiden University

Living people
Theoretical physicists
1968 births